Tian Yi (1534 - 1605) was a eunuch serving at the imperial court of the Ming Dynasty. He served under the Jiajing, the Longqing, and the Wanli emperors for a total of 63 years 
and eventually rose to a high position in the court, overseeing the 
Directorate of Ceremonies ("Master of the Seal in charge of rituals 
) which ranked first among the twelve eunuch directorates. 
By the time of this death, he had become the favorite eunuch of the Wanli emperor. 
 
Tian Yi was born in Shaanxi Province and was 
castrated at age 9. He entered the imperial court 
immediately afterwards. When he died in 1605, the 
Wanli Emperor ordered three days of mourning and the construction of a tomb with many features of 
an imperial mausoleum to commemorate him.

Tomb
Tian Yi's tomb has a traditional layout in which a spirit way serves as a central axis and a division 
between a front portion used by visitors to pay their respects and a 
closed off back portion. Four eunuchs, who lived 
at the tomb as monks during the Qing dynasty are buried next to 
Tian Yi. 
 
The tomb is particularly rich in stone carvings. The masonry artworks include 
three gates (front gate, Lingxing gate, and the graveyard gate), sculptures 
that line the spirit way, steles, ceremonial vessels, and stone altars 
for sacrifices. The names of 259 eunuchs who 
participated in his funeral are also inscribed at the tomb. Notably, the stone statues of the guards before the tomb both wear the uniforms of officials of the first rank, a sign of exceptional favour from the Emperor. 
 
The tomb was looted during the period of the Republic of China. Today, it houses the Eunuch Museum, the 
address is 80 Moshikou Street, Shijingshan district, Beijing.

References

1534 births
1605 deaths
Ming dynasty eunuchs